Erechim is a Brazilian municipality located in the southern state of Rio Grande do Sul.  A regional center in the northern portion of the state, it is the second most populous city in the region with 106,633 inhabitants, second only to the city of Passo Fundo.  The municipality ranks 17th in total gross domestic product in the state of Rio Grande do Sul.

Erechim was one of the first planned modern cities in Brazil. City planners were inspired by urban concepts used in the design of Washington, D.C. (1791) and Paris (1850). These were characterized by very wide streets and bold outlines, with diagonal streets converging at important points. Key elements of its design include a perpendicular grid of streets cut by diagonal avenues, blocks of regular dimensions and a promenade around its perimeter.

The municipality is located north of Rio Grande do Sul, in the Upper Uruguay, on the ridge of the Serra Geral. The origin of the name of Erechim refers to the ancient indigenous inhabitants of the region, and comes from "Caingangue, which means "small field"; it probably was given this name as the city was surrounded by forests at the time.

History

The city was initially called the Great Barn and then successively named Boa Vista, Boa Vista Erechim, Jose Bonifacio Erechim and finally just Erechim. Like many other villages in Brazil, it was built beside the railroad, in this case, the railroad that linked Rio Grande do Sul to São Paulo.

The town was settled mostly by Polish, Italian and German immigrants, 36 pioneers from Europe and others from the old lands (Caxias do Sul). They came by railroad in 1908, building their homes beside the track, and the place soon became a district of Passo Fundo.

The town's early economy depended on agriculture, livestock production, trade and services. It thrived and the city of Erechim was created on April 30, 1918, through Decree No. 2343 of April 30, signed by Antonio Borges, then governor of Rio Grande do Sul.

Once known as the "Capital of Wheat" due to the high volumes of grain produced, today Erechim is considered the "Capital of Friendship".

Origins of the city's urban design
The following testimony was written in 1970 by José Maria de Amorim, the first clerk of Erechim, who lived there from 1924 until the date of his death on December 12, 1978. He recounts the design aspects of the city, its origin and its setbacks, which are not yet recorded in the official history of the county.

Today Erechim, with its ups and downs, is still thriving and flourishing. It has the air of a big city, with its cobbled streets and low buildings, and is increasingly known as the Capital of Friendship.

Notable people
Victoria's Secret supermodel Alessandra Ambrosio (b. 1981) was born in Erechim.

Also well known are Erechim born football players including former goalkeeper Gilmar Rinaldi, who played at Internacional, São Paulo and Flamengo, Fernando, former striker Rafael Sóbis and the former midfielder and current coach, Paulo Cesar Carpeggiani.

Transportation
Erechim is served by Erechim Airport with scheduled flights to various cities.

The city can be reached by road via state highways RS-135, RS-331, RS-419, RS-420, RST-480, and federal highways BR-153 and BR-480. These roads link the various municipalities in the region and are all paved. Erechim lies 360 km from the state capital, Porto Alegre.

References

Municipalities in Rio Grande do Sul